Nick Davis (born 30 March 1980) is a former professional Australian rules footballer and rugby league footballer who played for the Collingwood Football Club and the Sydney Swans in the Australian Football League (AFL), and for the Sydney Roosters in the NRL Nines.

Collingwood

Born in Melbourne, and moving to Sydney at the age of four, Davis played rugby league football as a schoolboy before becoming involved in Australian rules. He was drafted by Collingwood, the club where his father Craig played 102 of his 163 VFL/AFL games, with a father-son pick in the 1998 AFL Draft. Davis was never comfortable living under the microscope at Victoria Park, where the expectations placed upon him were magnified by the spectre of his father's courageous attitude to the game and triumph over adversity, combined with the Magpie fans' insatiable desire for success.

After 16 games in his debut season, a homesick Davis fled back to Sydney after just two days of his second pre-season campaign. It took two weeks for him to regain enough composure to return to Melbourne.

At the end of his two-year contract, Davis re-signed and rewarded the club's faith with a solid year, kicking 36 goals in 21 games. But after an injury-riddled pre-season in 2002 and some indifferent performances early in the year, pressure mounted on Davis to re-sign with the Magpies. He said he wanted to wait until the end of the season, a decision that did not go down well with the Magpie hierarchy.

After playing 20 games – including a cracker against Adelaide in the preliminary final win that steered Collingwood into the 2002 Grand Final – Davis told the Magpies he wanted to go home. A last-minute trade – a bargain that cost the Swans just a second round pick in the 2002 draft – paved the way for Davis to move home.

Sydney career 

He hit the ground running in 2003 with 32 goals in 24 appearances before injuries again interceded in 2004; first hip, then ankle. The rigours of rehabilitating an injured ankle quickly eroded Davis's desire to play footy. For two days in June 2004, the club did not know of his whereabouts—and, when he did return, he was having serious thoughts about shifting to rugby league.

Davis' enthusiasm eventually returned, and, although he showed glimpses of his best (like the three impressive goals in the round 21 win over the Bombers at Telstra Stadium), he carried the remnants of the hip and ankle injuries through the year.

2005 – Realising potential 

Despite a three-week stint on the sidelines with a hamstring strain mid-year, including missing the season-turning 43-point defeat to  after which he was recalled to the side, Davis's form continually improved throughout 2005. He was rewarded for his superior fitness with the occasional run through the midfield, while 12 of his 31 goals for the season came in the final month.

2005 semi-final

In a low-scoring game at the small Sydney Cricket Ground, Sydney trailed 3.12 (30) to 6.11 (47) at three-quarter time, which increased to a 23-point margin after Davis's direct opponent, David Johnson, kicked the opening goal of the final quarter.

Davis then recovered to kick the last four goals of the game, delivering Sydney a three-point victory, 7.14 (56) d. 7.11 (53). His first three goals came from two difficult snaps and a set-shot, and the last came from a stoppage in the final five seconds of the game. The ball-up twenty metres from the Swans' goal was tapped to a running Davis by ruckman Jason Ball. Davis did not have time to take a clean possession, and on the wrong side of the goal for a right-footed player of his nature. Davis juggled the ball before snapping a shot with his left foot, kicking a goal to put Sydney ahead with just three seconds remaining. It is considered one of the greatest individual quarters of football ever played.

As a result of Davis's heroics, Sydney progressed to the preliminary final against St Kilda. Sydney won that game, and they went on to win the 2005 Grand Final against  to end a 72-year club premiership drought.

"I'm a scapegoat"
In round 14 of 2006 after the Swans had played Adelaide at the SCG, Nick Davis was dropped from the seniors and sent to the reserves. This proved to be a major challenge. After an outcry to the media, coach Paul Roos was furious and kept him playing in the reserves for 6 weeks. However, he came back in round 21 and played all the remaining games of the season, including the 2006 Grand Final, where he was one of Sydney's best, kicking 3 goals.

2008–present

Nick Davis played only three games for the Swans in 2008, after being dropped for a period and then being brought back in to cover during Barry Hall's seven-match suspension for striking Brent Staker. He played in the controversial draw against North Melbourne, when Sydney had an extra man on the field for 90 seconds near the end of the game, before again being dropped. He did not play another game for the Swans for the year due to dislocating his kneecap and requiring surgery, and he was not offered another contract at the end of the season.

Davis flagged an interest in moving to Perth to play for the West Coast Eagles when he came out of contract at the end of the 2008 season. He was delisted at the end of the year and was not selected in the 2008 AFL Draft. He attempted to convert sports to become a punter in the NFL, but was not signed by any team.

In 2012, Davis became a runner for the Sydney Swans and was also employed as a marking and kicking coach for the Cronulla Sharks. He then moved to the Sydney Roosters to be their kicking coach.In 2020, the club also announced they had signed him for the NRL Nines. Davis's press conference announcing the signing was attended by both Roosters head coach Trent Robinson and Swans head coach John Longmire.

Statistics

|- style="background-color: #EAEAEA"
! scope="row" style="text-align:center" | 1999
|style="text-align:center;"|
| 19 || 16 || 5 || 9 || 117 || 54 || 171 || 43 || 9 || 0.3 || 0.6 || 7.3 || 3.4 || 10.7 || 2.7 || 0.6
|-
! scope="row" style="text-align:center" | 2000
|style="text-align:center;"|
| 19 || 14 || 13 || 8 || 142 || 69 || 211 || 76 || 10 || 0.9 || 0.6 || 10.1 || 4.9 || 15.1 || 5.4 || 0.7
|- style="background-color: #EAEAEA"
! scope="row" style="text-align:center" | 2001
|style="text-align:center;"|
| 19 || 21 || 36 || 15 || 242 || 100 || 342 || 115 || 27 || 1.7 || 0.7 || 11.5 || 4.8 || 16.3 || 5.5 || 1.3
|-
! scope="row" style="text-align:center" | 2002
|style="text-align:center;"|
| 19 || 20 || 31 || 22 || 156 || 39 || 195 || 84 || 15 || 1.6 || 1.1 || 7.8 || 2.0 || 9.8 || 4.2 || 0.8
|- style="background:#eaeaea;"
! scope="row" style="text-align:center" | 2003
|style="text-align:center;"|
| 2 || 24 || 32 || 19 || 211 || 105 || 316 || 91 || 35 || 1.3 || 0.8 || 8.8 || 4.4 || 13.2 || 3.8 || 1.5
|-
! scope="row" style="text-align:center" | 2004
|style="text-align:center;"|
| 2 || 12 || 21 || 7 || 67 || 37 || 104 || 34 || 9 || 1.8 || 0.6 || 5.6 || 3.1 || 8.7 || 2.8 || 0.8
|- style="background:#eaeaea;"
! scope="row" style="text-align:center" | 2005
|style="text-align:center;"|
| 2 || 23 || 38 || 21 || 210 || 89 || 299 || 95 || 29 || 1.7 || 0.9 || 9.1 || 3.9 || 13.0 || 4.1 || 1.3
|-
! scope="row" style="text-align:center" | 2006
|style="text-align:center;"|
| 2 || 17 || 23 || 18 || 160 || 74 || 234 || 92 || 34 || 1.4 || 1.1 || 9.4 || 4.4 || 13.8 || 5.4 || 2.0
|- style="background:#eaeaea;"
! scope="row" style="text-align:center" | 2007
|style="text-align:center;"|
| 2 || 18 || 33 || 12 || 139 || 73 || 212 || 69 || 23 || 1.8 || 0.7 || 7.7 || 4.1 || 11.8 || 3.8 || 1.3
|-
! scope="row" style="text-align:center" | 2008
|style="text-align:center;"|
| 2 || 3 || 3 || 4 || 21 || 12 || 33 || 15 || 4 || 1.0 || 1.3 || 7.0 || 4.0 || 11.0 || 5.0 || 1.3
|- class="sortbottom"
! colspan=3| Career
! 168
! 235
! 135
! 1465
! 652
! 2117
! 714
! 195
! 1.4
! 0.8
! 8.7
! 3.9
! 12.6
! 4.3
! 1.2
|}

References 

Australian rules footballers from Sydney
Collingwood Football Club players
Sydney Swans players
Sydney Swans Premiership players
NSW/ACT Rams players
St George AFC players
1980 births
Living people
Australia international rules football team players
One-time VFL/AFL Premiership players